Île-de-France tramway Line 2 (T2; French: Ligne 2 du tramway d'Île-de-France) is part of the modern tram network of the Île-de-France region of France. It connects the commune of Bezons in the north to the Porte de Versailles Métro station in Paris in the south, serving Hauts-de-Seine and its La Défense business district.

The initial section between La Défense station and Issy–Val de Seine station, opened in July 1997, uses a former heavy rail line converted into light rail, whereas the further extensions on both ends opened in November 2009 and November 2012 feature segregated on-street running.

Route

Communes served
Line 2 serves the communes of Bezons (one stop), Colombes (three stops), La Garenne-Colombes (two stops), Courbevoie (one stop), Puteaux (two stops), Suresnes (two stops), Saint-Cloud (three stops), Sèvres (one stop), Meudon (two stops), Issy-les-Moulineaux (three stops) and Paris (four stops).

Places of interest
The line allows visitors to access the Grande Arche in La Défense, the Parc de Saint-Cloud at the eponym stop, the Manufacture nationale de Sèvres at Musée de Sèvres and Paris expo Porte de Versailles at its southern terminus.

Rolling stock
Line 2 is operated by the Régie autonome des transports parisiens (RATP) under the authority of Île-de-France Mobilités (IDFM). The line's success (115,000 people use it daily) led to its Tramway Français Standard (TFS) rolling stock to be replaced starting in 2002 by Alstom Citadis trams; the TFS rolling stock was transferred to Île-de-France tramway Line 1 to increase its capacity.

As the Citadis trams also rapidly proved insufficient in terms of size, they were doubled in length in 2005 by using a Scharfenberg coupler, raising the capacity of each tram to 440 passengers. Several stops were also therefore doubled in length. With the extension to Porte de Versailles and the line crossing several intersections, the RATP had each tram's front and rear coupler covered, so that in the event of a collision with a pedestrian, the damage sustained by the person would be less severe.

Gallery

References

Tramways in Paris
Tram lines in Île-de-France